Over Alderley is a civil parish in Cheshire, England. It had a population of 318 at the 2011 Census.

It includes the hamlets of Adders Moss, Adshead Green, Broadheath, Finlow Hill, Harebarrow, Harehill, Shaw Cross, Vardentown and Whirley.

Notable buildings
St Catherine's Church, Over Alderley is a Grade II* listed building.

Alderley Lodge was built in the 19th century for the Brocklehurst family; it sits next to the National Trust land at Hare Hill.

Nearby Birtles Hall is listed Grade II.

See also

Listed buildings in Over Alderley

References

Civil parishes in Cheshire